Siphlopteryx is a genus of flies belonging to the family of the Lesser Dung flies. It contains one species, Siphlopteryx antarctica.

References

Sphaeroceridae
Sphaeroceroidea genera
Insects of Antarctica